Ram, ram, or RAM may refer to:

Animals
 A male sheep
 Ram cichlid, a freshwater tropical fish

People
 Ram (given name)
 Ram (surname)
 Ram (director) (Ramsubramaniam), an Indian Tamil film director
 RAM (musician) (born 1974), Dutch
 Raja Ram (musician) (Ronald Rothfield), Australian
 Ram Dass (Richard Alpert), US spiritual teacher and author
 Kavitark Ram Shriram (born 1950s), Google founding board member
 Ram Herrera, a Tejano musician

Religion
 Rama, incarnation of the god Vishnu in Hinduism
 Ram and Rud, progenitors of the second generation of humans in Mandaeism

Places
 Ram, Serbia, Veliko Gradište
 Lake Ram, Golan Heights, Syria
 Ram Island (disambiguation), several islands with the name
 Ram Fortress,  Serbia
 Ram Range, a mountain range in the Canadian Rockies
 Ram River in Alberta, Canada
 Ramingining Airport, IATA airport code "RAM"

Arts, entertainment, and media
 Ram (album), a 1971 album by Paul and Linda McCartney
 RAM (band), Port-au-Prince, Haiti
 Ram FM, a radio station, Derbyshire, England 1994–2010
 Ram Part:1, an upcoming Indian film written and directed by Jeethu Joseph
 RAM Records, UK
Random Access Memories, a 2013 album by Daft Punk
 Rock Australia Magazine, 1975–1989

Organizations

Museums
 Rockbund Art Museum, Shanghai, China
 Royal Alberta Museum, Edmonton, Alberta, Canada

Other organizations
 Revolutionary Action Movement, 1960s US black nationalist organization
 Reform the Armed Forces Movement, a Philippines military cabal 1980s-1990s
 Remote Area Medical Volunteer Corps, US healthcare organization
 Renew America Movement, US political group 
 Residents Action Movement, New Zealand political party
 Resistencia Ancestral Mapuche, alleged separatist organization in Argentina and Chile
 Rise Above Movement, American white nationalist organization
 Royal Academy of Music, London, UK
 Royal Air Maroc, the national airline of Morocco

Astrology
 Aries (astrology), astrological sign also known as the Ram
 Goat (zodiac) or Ram, a sign of the Chinese zodiac

Science and technology

Computing

 Random-access memory, computer memory
Random-access machine, a theoretical computer model
.ram, a file extension for the RealAudio file format

Military
 Ram (rocket), a US Korean War anti-tank weapon
 A device used for ramming
 Ram tank, Canada, WWII
 RIM-116 Rolling Airframe Missile, a naval surface-to-air missile

Other uses in science and technology
 Extension ram, a hydraulic rescue tool
 Hydraulic ram
 Radar-absorbent material
 Rechargeable alkaline manganese battery
Reliability, availability, and maintainability, in logistics
 Root apical meristem, a plant tissue

Transportation
 Ram Trucks, US, since 2009
 List of vehicles named Dodge Ram, trucks and vans
 Ram Pickup, produced by Ram Trucks

Other uses
 Aries (constellation), also known as the Ram
 Ram languages, of Papua New Guinea
 RAM Racing, F1 team 1976–1985

See also
 Rams (disambiguation)